Norismaidham bin Ismail (born 30 June 1984) is a Malaysian footballer currently playing in the Malaysia FAM League for AirAsia F.C.

References

Living people
1984 births
Malaysian footballers
Kuala Lumpur City F.C. players
Negeri Sembilan FA players
Sportspeople from Kuala Lumpur
Association football midfielders